Hubert Crawford was an American baseball infielder in the Negro leagues. He played with the Bacharach Giants in 1932 and the Newark Eagles in 1936.

References

External links
 and Baseball-Reference Black Baseball stats and Seamheads

Bacharach Giants players
Newark Eagles players
Year of birth missing
Year of death missing
Baseball infielders